The World Bodypainting Festival is a bodypainting festival and competition which is held annually in Austria, since 2017 in Klagenfurt. It is attended by artists from 50 nations and attracts many thousands of spectators.

Festival

The World Bodypainting Festival is the biggest annual event in bodypainting culture, and provides a worldwide platform for the art. It takes place in summer, usually in July, as part of the festival season of the southern region of Austria. It attracts artists from more than fifty countries and more than 30,000 spectators, and has been involved in creating the modern bodypainting art movement.

The festival consists of a preparatory week of workshops and side events, followed by three main days over a long weekend. The workshops, run by the affiliated WB Academy, include lessons by leading artists in brush and sponge, airbrush, special effects, beauty make-up, and head dressing, including colour theory and history. All workshops are run and handled under the WB Academy. Side events include parties such as the surreal Costume Ball (Body Circus) with international DJs and musical stage performances, and also exhibitions, gatherings, and industry discussions.

The three main days are open to the general public in the Goethepark in Klagenfurt, dubbed "Bodypaint City". World, Special and Amateur Awards are held. The festival is open to adults and children, and is considered a family-friendly environment; visitors are able to step "into the surreal" and also to express themselves in participatory activities. Bodypaint City includes a VIP area, a bodypainting manufacturer and suppliers' market, fashion and crafts market, food and beverage vendors, headline stage bands, performers and international DJs throughout various musical zones. Artists compete on all three days with a given theme in the categories of brush and sponge, airbrush and special effects for the World Champion Award, announced on Sunday. Also included are the World Facepainting Award, Amateur Award, Installation Award, Special Effects Face Make-up, Make-up Battle Award and the Photo Award. The festival closes with a Paint Party.

History
The festival was launched in 1998 in Seeboden in the state of Carinthia, as the European Bodypainting Festival by then tourism manager Alex Barendregt, to promote summer tourism to the region. It was the first "boutique event" of its kind in the world. Also launched in conjunction was the WB Academy, which in 2008 expanded its workshops worldwide. As the bodypainting movement was growing, on 12 October 2001 Barendregt launched the European Body Painting Association as a networking and support organization for bodypainting artists, and WB Production followed in 2010.

Due to the increasing attendance of international artists and supporters at the festival, in 2004 it was renamed to the World Bodypainting Festival and the association to the World Bodypainting Association. In 2011 Barendregt left his position at the tourist office and moved the festival to  Pörtschach, on the Wörthersee. In 2017 the festival venue moved to the state capital of Klagenfurt, where it is held in the Goethepark. The city gallery (Stadtgalerie), the Museum of Modern Art Carinthia (MMKK), the literature museum (Musil Museum), theatres and privately owned galleries are all nearby, providing opportunities for networking and exhibits to the bodypainting artists.

Gallery

References

External links
 Official site
 WB Production
 Photo galleries from past World Bodypainting Festivals, World Bodypainting Association
 2017 World Bodypainting Festival photo gallery, New Haven Register

Body art
Art festivals in Austria
Festivals established in 1998
Nude art